Dante Fabbro (born June 20, 1998) is a Canadian professional ice hockey defenceman for the Nashville Predators of the National Hockey League (NHL). He was selected in the first round, 17th overall, in the 2016 NHL Entry Draft by the Predators.

Playing career
Fabbro was originally drafted by the Seattle Thunderbirds in the 1st round (8th overall) of the 2013 WHL Bantam Draft, but decided to play with the Penticton Vees of the BCHL to retain his NCAA eligibility. During the 2015–16 BCHL season, Fabbro was named an alternate captain and ended the season being named the Best Defenseman in the league. He committed to play for Boston University for the 2016–17 season before being drafted 17th overall in the 2016 NHL Entry Draft. During his sophomore season, Fabbro was selected for the Hockey East Second All-Star Team after coming in second among Hockey East defensemen in points.

On March 27, 2019, Fabbro signed a three-year, entry-level contract with the Nashville Predators. He made his NHL debut a few days later on March 30, in a 5–2 loss to the Columbus Blue Jackets and recorded his first career NHL goal on April 9, 2019.

International play

Fabbro made his first World Juniors appearance when he was selected to represent Canada at the 2017 World Junior Ice Hockey Championships. The following year, Fabbro was selected as an alternate captain for Team Canada at the 2018 World Junior Ice Hockey Championships, where he helped guide them to a gold medal.

On April 29, 2019, following his first playoff experience with the Predators, Fabbro was named to the Team Canada roster for the 2019 IIHF World Championship held in Slovakia. Fabbro helped Canada progress through to the playoff rounds before losing the final to Finland to finish with the Silver Medal on May 26, 2019. He finished the tournament posting 1 goal and 3 points from the blueline in 9 games.

Personal life
Fabbro is the youngest of three children born to Tina and Steve Fabbro.

Career statistics

Regular season and playoffs

International

Awards and honours

References

External links
 

1998 births
Living people
Boston University Terriers men's ice hockey players
Canadian ice hockey defencemen
Canadian people of Italian descent
Ice hockey people from British Columbia
Langley Rivermen players
Nashville Predators draft picks
Nashville Predators players
National Hockey League first-round draft picks
Penticton Vees players